Mladen Rudonja (born 26 July 1971) is a retired Slovenian footballer. He most often played as a winger (usually on the left) or striker. Despite this, he did not score a goal for the Slovenian national team until his 53rd cap – in the second leg of the 2002 FIFA World Cup qualifying playoffs against Romania in Bucharest. The match ended with a score of 1–1, a result that was enough to secure Slovenia's first-ever qualification for the main World Cup event.

His son, named Roy, is also a footballer.

See also
Slovenian international players

References

External links
Player profile at NZS 

1971 births
Living people
Sportspeople from Koper
Slovenian footballers
Association football wingers
FC Koper players
NK Zagreb players
NK Olimpija Ljubljana (1945–2005) players
NK Marsonia players
ND Gorica players
NK Primorje players
Sint-Truidense V.V. players
Portsmouth F.C. players
Apollon Limassol FC players
Anorthosis Famagusta F.C. players
NK Olimpija Ljubljana (2005) players
Slovenian PrvaLiga players
Croatian Football League players
Belgian Pro League players
English Football League players
Cypriot First Division players
Slovenian Second League players
Slovenian expatriate footballers
Slovenian expatriate sportspeople in Croatia
Expatriate footballers in Croatia
Slovenian expatriate sportspeople in Belgium
Expatriate footballers in Belgium
Slovenian expatriate sportspeople in England
Expatriate footballers in England
Slovenian expatriate sportspeople in Cyprus
Expatriate footballers in Cyprus
Slovenian expatriate sportspeople in Austria
Expatriate footballers in Austria
UEFA Euro 2000 players
2002 FIFA World Cup players
Slovenia international footballers
Association football chairmen and investors